Red Riding is a British crime drama limited series written by Tony Grisoni and based on the book series of the same name by David Peace. The series comprises the novels Nineteen Seventy-Four (1999), Nineteen Seventy-Seven (2000), Nineteen Eighty (2001) and Nineteen Eighty-Three (2002), and the first, third, and fourth of these novels became three feature-length television episodes, Red Riding 1974, Red Riding 1980, and Red Riding 1983. They aired in the United Kingdom on Channel 4 beginning on 5 March 2009. The three episodes were released theatrically in the United States between 5 and 11 February 2010, by IFC Films.

The context of the series uses fictionalized accounts of the investigation into the Yorkshire Ripper, a serial killer that stalked the Yorkshire area of England in the 1970s and 1980s. The name of the series is a reference to the murders and to their location, the historic county of Yorkshire being traditionally divided into three areas known as ridings.

Overview
The events take place between 1974 and 1983 and have as their background the Yorkshire Ripper killings. Set in Leeds, Bradford, Halifax, and the rest of West Yorkshire, both books and films follow several recurring fictional characters through a bleak and violent world of police corruption and organised crime. The novels and television versions blend elements of fact, fiction, and conspiracy theory into a confection dubbed "Yorkshire Noir" by some critics. They offer a chronologically fractured narrative and do not present neat resolutions.

Plot summaries

Red Riding 1974
Director: Julian Jarrold
Technique: Super 16 mm film with an aspect ratio of 16:9
Run time: 1 hour, 42 minutes
Rating: 3.07m
1974. Eddie Dunford (Andrew Garfield) is a cocky and naïve cub reporter for The Yorkshire Post. John Dawson (Sean Bean) is an unscrupulous local real estate developer, representing a group of investors. Their paths cross when Dunford investigates a series of murdered or missing schoolgirls, one of whom is found on Dawson's property, tortured, raped, and strangled. Dawson has used a combination of bribery (small ownership shares in a new shopping centre) and blackmail to secure the support of the local councillors, allowing him to purchase land and gain zoning approval to construct the shopping centre. He has also used the same bribes and blackmail with the newly formed West Yorkshire Metropolitan Police (WYMP), who harass the Romani people camping on the land he wants.

Dunford is spurred on by comments from people, including his gay reporter friend Barry Gannon (Anthony Flanagan), who warns of trouble then dies in an accident. An elusive male hustler, B.J. (Robert Sheehan), gives Dunford incriminating materials gathered by Gannon (some provided by Dawson) about local officials. During his investigation of Gannon's death, Dunford believes that he has found an ally in a reform-minded young police officer.

Dunford becomes romantically involved with Paula Garland (Rebecca Hall), mother of a missing girl. He learns from Paula that she is also sexually involved with Dawson, whom she has known all her life.

Dunford ignores corrupt WYMP officers' threats, complete with beatings, to lay off the story. Dunford convinces Paula to leave town with him, then briefly leaves her to deliver the Gannon materials to his police officer friend. When he returns, Paula is missing, so he storms a large party at Dawson's palatial home, celebrating the signing of the shopping centre deal, to demand Paula be returned.

Dunford is arrested by corrupt cops, brutally beaten and psychologically tortured, then shown Paula's dead body. His supposed ally policeman has given the Gannon documents to Detective Superintendent Maurice Jobson (David Morrissey), who has them destroyed. The only remaining threat to the corrupt officials is that Dawson might talk, so police officers Tommy Douglas (Tony Mooney) and Bob Craven (Sean Harris) finish torturing Dunford, tell him that Dawson killed Paula (the viewer never knows for sure), then give him a loaded handgun to deal with Dawson.

Bloody and frantic, Dunford seeks out Dawson, eventually finding him at his private club the Karachi. Dawson offers that he was "no angel" and that he had "a private weakness", implying that he is somehow connected to the murdered and missing girls. Dunford shoots Dawson dead and flees in his car, but reverses course when he finds himself chased by police cars. Dunford deliberately drives toward the pursuing police cars. A vision of Paula appears to him before his death in the ensuing collision.

Red Riding 1980
Director: James Marsh
Technique: 2-perf 35 mm film with an anamorphic aspect ratio of 2.35:1
Run time: 1 hour, 33 minutes
Rating: 1.99m
In 1980, following public outcry over the failure to catch the Yorkshire Ripper, a "squeaky clean" Manchester police detective, Assistant Chief Constable Peter Hunter (Paddy Considine), is assigned to travel to West Yorkshire to head the WYMP investigation, much to the chagrin of the former head, Bill Molloy (Warren Clarke). Hunter had previously worked on the Karachi Club massacre, a case he had to abandon due to his wife Joan's miscarriage. One member of Hunter's new, hand-picked team is Helen Marshall (Maxine Peake), his former adulterous lover. The two cases – massacre and serial killings – are linked by Officer Bob Craven (Sean Harris), who behaves in an openly hostile manner to the new team. Hunter correctly deduces that the Ripper inquiry is being side-tracked by the Wearside Jack tapes, and feels that the real Ripper has been interviewed and missed.

Hunter suspects that one of the Ripper's supposed victims, Clare Strachan, was not actually a Ripper victim. Hunter receives information on the murder from B.J., who is introduced through Reverend Laws (Peter Mullan). B.J. claims that Strachan was a prostitute working for Eric Hall, a now-dead WYMP policeman. Hall's wife requests that Hunter meet her, and after visiting her house – where Reverend Laws is also present – she provides Hunter with proof of Hall's work as a pimp and pornographer, and that she gave Hall's documents to Jobson. Jobson claims to have lost the files. Meanwhile, the former affair between Hunter and Marshall threatens to reignite.

Hunter interrogates Inspectors Dickie Alderman and Jim Prentice, who lets slip that the Strachan murder was probably performed by Hall, covered-up to look like a Ripper murder. Hunter also visits the now debilitated Tommy Douglas who later phones him demanding that they meet at his house. However, Hunter arrives to find Douglas and his daughter killed. Hunter is seriously intimidated when he receives covertly taken photos of himself and Marshall in compromising positions.

Near the end of Hunter's Christmas holiday, his Manchester house is burned down. Hunter then learns that his superiors have taken him off the Ripper case due to unspecified allegations of disciplinary breaches. He returns to West Yorkshire for a scheduled meeting with Jobson, but it appears, amid great fanfare, that the Yorkshire Ripper has been captured. The suspect confesses to all murders except that of Strachan, which he explicitly denies.

Hunter tracks down B.J. and forces him to reveal that five masked policemen burst into the Karachi Club minutes after Eddie Dunford's revenge, killing all civilian survivors and finding Bob Craven and Tommy Douglas wounded by Eddie. Strachan was a barmaid at the club; she and her friend B.J. witnessed the whole scene while hiding behind the bar, and were spotted by Angus and Craven as they fled the premises. B.J. is, therefore, the only surviving witness to the Karachi Club massacre, which forces him to flee town. Hunter's dialogue with B.J. also implies that Craven was the murderer of Strachan as well as Douglas.

Hunter returns to Millgarth Station, Leeds, to reveal this new information to Detective Chief Superintendent John Nolan (Tony Pitts). Nolan takes Hunter downstairs to the cells where Hunter enters to see Craven slouched back in a chair, shot through his head. He realises that Nolan was one of the five who took part in the Karachi Club shootings, but Nolan quickly shoots him dead. Alderman and Prentice plant the gun to make it look like Hunter and Craven shot each other. In a final scene, Joan Hunter is comforted by Reverend Laws at her husband's graveside.

Red Riding 1983
Director: Anand Tucker
Technique: taped with a Red One digital camera
Run time: 1 hour, 45 minutes
Rating: 2.05m
In 1983, Detective Inspector Maurice Jobson is plagued by guilt over his reluctant participation in the corrupt activities within the WYMP. It is revealed that it was he who tipped off Dunford about the arson in the Roma camp near Hunslet, in which Jobson took part under pressure by Molloy. It is also revealed that the camp site had to be vacated to pursue a £100m joint investment between Dawson and the top echelons of the WYMP (including Jobson, Molloy, Angus, Alderman, Prentice, Nolan, Douglas and Craven) on a project for a shopping centre. It is also revealed that he knew about the innocence of Michael Myshkin (Daniel Mays), a learning disabled man who was accused of the serial killings in 1974. Jobson is aware of a conspiracy within the WYMP protecting high-profile figures, including Dawson, from public exposure. Jobson's pangs of conscience are brought upon by his investigation into the recent disappearance of a young girl named Hazel Atkins, and lead him to open previous cases. He also starts an intimate relationship with a medium (Saskia Reeves), who seems to be in possession of valuable information concerning the more recent crimes.

Meanwhile, John Piggott (Mark Addy), a solicitor and the son of a notorious WYMP officer, decides to explore the Atkins case himself. His inquiries lead him to Leonard Cole (Gerard Kearns), the young man who found the swan-stitched victim in 1974 and who is now being framed for Atkins' disappearance. Cole is tortured and murdered by the police, his death disguised as a suicide. Using information given by Myshkin, Piggott finds a mine shaft hidden in a pigeon shed near Laws' home, where it is revealed that a paedophile and child-murdering ring was run in West Yorkshire by Reverend Laws, and that clients of this ring included significant figures of society, among them businessmen such as Dawson and policemen such as Piggott's own father.

It is implied that only when children with known, stable local families were abducted did the criminal structure run the risk of being made public. This was the main reason for the constables' indirect assistance in Dawson's demise, thereby solving the "two little problems" referred to by Angus (a nosy young journalist and a businessman with a dark secret) at the same time without compromising their million-pound investment in the commercial centre. It is clear that, at least after 1974, Laws counted on the complicity and even direct collaboration of high-ranking officials in the WYMP, although the extent of his grip on the police, the reasons why he did not share a fate similar to Dawson's and the degree of knowledge WYMP brass had of his and Dawson's activities prior to 1974 are left open to speculation.

Finally, it is also revealed that B.J. was the first child abducted by this criminal enterprise, and perhaps the only one who survived. He ends up returning to Laws' home to enact revenge, but in the last moment finds himself unable to do so due to Laws' mind-numbing, domineering influence on him. Seconds before Laws is about to drill into B.J.'s head with an electric drill, Jobson appears with a shotgun and shoots the reverend three times, killing him. He then opens the hidden entrance to the mine shaft just in time for Piggott to emerge from it with a still-living Hazel Atkins in his arms. B.J. flees southward by train, reflecting on his upbringing, his experiences, and his "escape" from the past of West Yorkshire. Thus three characters – Jobson, Piggott and B.J. – achieve some measure of redemption in the end.

Cast

Filming and production
On 8 and 10 September 2008 the cast and crew were spotted filming at the Connaught Rooms on Manningham Lane, and a Victorian house on the corner of Selbourne Mount and North Park Road, just across the road from Cartwright Hall in Lister Park, Manningham, Bradford, West Yorkshire, which was also used. On 5 October Sean Bean, Paddy Considine, Jim Carter, Warren Clarke, Chris Walker, Sean Harris and James Weaver were spotted filming at the Connaught Rooms again, which was used multiple more times in the following weeks. The cast and crew were later spotted filming in Little Germany, Bradford. Filming also took place at the former Presbyterian Church on 1 Simes Street, Bradford, which was being used as the Koh-I-Noor Indian restaurant at the time, was used as The Karachi Club in the trilogy. The former Bradford Central Police Station on The Tyrls in Bradford city centre, which has since been demolished and built over with Bradford City Park, was also used.

Other locations included Seacroft Hospital and Brudenell Social Club in Leeds, West Yorkshire. The Brudenell was also used as The Karachi Club in the trilogy. HM Prison Leeds, Cookridge Hospital, and The Yorkshire Post's Wellington Street building which was demolished in 2014, in Leeds were also used.

Filming also took place at Arden Road Social Club in Halifax, West Yorkshire, the National Coal Mining Museum for England in Wakefield, West Yorkshire, and Huddersfield, West Yorkshire.

Historical basis

The television trailers for all three Red Riding episodes bore the tagline "Based on True Events". Nevertheless, none of the characters, nor the murder victims, bear the names of real people and only a few have obvious real-life models.

The wrongful prosecution and imprisonment of the character Michael Myshkin is a clear parallel to the real-life case of Stefan Kiszko, falsely accused of and convicted for the killing of 11-year-old Lesley Molseed in 1975. He was later proved innocent.

The mission and subsequent official vilification of Assistant Chief Constable Peter Hunter in Red Riding 1980 are strongly reminiscent of the case of John Stalker, a real life Deputy Chief Constable of the Greater Manchester Police who headed an investigation into the shooting of suspected members of the Provisional Irish Republican Army in 1982.

Awards and nominations
The films won The TV Dagger at the 2009 Crime Thriller Awards.

Theatrical film adaptation
Columbia Pictures acquired the rights to adapt the novels and films into a theatrical film. The studio was negotiating with Ridley Scott in October 2009 to direct.

The trilogy was released on DVD and Blu-ray in the United States by IFC Films on 5 February 2010.

Overseas broadcasting
The series has been aired by Danish public broadcaster DR1 on two occasions under the title Pigen med den røde hætte (The Girl with the Red Cap). It has also been aired by SVT, Sweden's public broadcaster, by Rai 4 in Italy, by ARD in Germany, and by SBS in Australia.

References

External links 
  – official site
 
 Northern Exposure, The Guardian, 28 February 2009
 Review, Leicester Mercury
 Review by Roger Ebert, 10 March 2010
 
 
 
 
 Detailed plot synopses

Channel 4 original programming
Films set in 1974
Films set in 1980
Films set in 1983
Television shows based on British novels
Films set in Yorkshire
Television shows set in Yorkshire
Films set in Leeds
Television shows set in Leeds
2009 British television series debuts
2009 British television series endings
2000s British drama television series
Neo-noir television series
2000s British crime television series
Films directed by Anand Tucker
Trilogies